Wolf Creek is a stream in Grundy County in the U.S. state of Missouri. It is a tributary of the Thompson River.

Wolf Creek most likely was named for the wolves encountered there by pioneers.

See also
List of rivers of Missouri

References

Rivers of Grundy County, Missouri
Rivers of Missouri